Jan Lála (born 10 September 1938) is a Czech football player. He played for Czechoslovakia, for which he played 37 matches and scored one goal.

He was a participant in the 1962 FIFA World Cup, where Czechoslovakia won the silver medal.

In his country he spent his best years playing for SK Slavia Prague.

References
 
 Slavia Prague profile 

1938 births
Czech footballers
Czechoslovak footballers
1962 FIFA World Cup players
Living people
SK Slavia Prague players
FK Ústí nad Labem players
FC Lausanne-Sport players
Czechoslovakia international footballers
Czechoslovak expatriate footballers
Czechoslovak expatriate sportspeople in Switzerland
Expatriate footballers in Switzerland
Association football defenders
People from Havlíčkův Brod District
Sportspeople from the Vysočina Region